Michael Gordon Wygant (born 1936, Newburgh, New York) is a former American diplomat who was the head of the Organization for Security and Co-operation in Europe (OSCE) Armenia office and was the first United States Ambassador to the Federated States of Micronesia.

Wygant graduated from Dartmouth College.

References

1936 births
20th-century American diplomats
21st-century American diplomats
Ambassadors of the United States to the Federated States of Micronesia
Dartmouth College alumni
Living people
People from Newburgh, New York
Organization for Security and Co-operation in Europe
Date of birth missing (living people)